is a Japanese footballer currently playing as a goalkeeper for Giravanz Kitakyushu of J2 League.

Career statistics

Club
.

Notes

References

External links

1996 births
Living people
Japanese footballers
Association football goalkeepers
J2 League players
J3 League players
Giravanz Kitakyushu players